The Countess of Sand (German: Die Sandgräfin) is a 1928 German silent drama film directed by Hans Steinhoff and starring Christa Tordy, Käthe von Nagy and Jack Trevor. It was shot at the Grunewald Studios in Berlin and on location in East Frisia. The film's art direction was by Otto Erdmann and Hans Sohnle.

Cast
Christa Tordy
Käthe von Nagy
Jack Trevor
Rudolf Klein-Rogge
Albert Steinrück
Hermann Picha
Henry Bender
Hans Brausewetter
Gertrud de Lalsky
Max Gülstorff
Paul Otto

Reception
The Grazer Tagblatt writes: "This is excellently successful film ... it's remarkable, apart from the enduring moment, which is taken into account in an extremely effective way".

References

External links

Films of the Weimar Republic
Films directed by Hans Steinhoff
German silent feature films
German black-and-white films
1928 films
1928 drama films
German drama films
1920s German films